Andrew Matthew Harrington (February 12, 1903 – January 29, 1979) was an American Major League Baseball player who played in one game for the Detroit Tigers on April 18, 1925. He was used as a pinch hitter for one at bat, and did not reach base.

External links

1903 births
1979 deaths
Detroit Tigers players
Baseball players from California
Saint Mary's Gaels baseball players
Twin Falls Cowboys players
Boise Pilots players